Georgina "Georgie" Clarke (born 17 June 1984 in Geelong) is an Australian athlete who specialised in the middle-distance events. She won multiple international medals at youth and junior levels. She competed at the 2000 Summer Olympics in Sydney at the age of 16. Competed for Geelong College.

Competition record

References

1984 births
Living people
Australian female middle-distance runners
Sportspeople from Geelong
Athletes (track and field) at the 2000 Summer Olympics
Olympic athletes of Australia
Competitors at the 2001 Goodwill Games
People educated at Geelong College
20th-century Australian women
21st-century Australian women